The Blue Danube (French: Le Danube bleu) is a 1940 drama film directed by Emil E. Reinert and Alfred Rode and starring Madeleine Sologne, José Noguéro and Marguerite Moreno. The film's sets were designed by the art director Émile Duquesne. Rode had produced a previous version of the film featuring Conchita Montenegro and Thomy Bourdelle but the negative of this was damaged during a March 1939 fire at the LTC laboratories in Paris and had to be re-shot with a different cast.

Synopsis
The attractive Anika is courted both by fellow gypsy Sandor and by the wealthy Féry. When the latter is found murdered, Sandor is chief suspect and its arrested. With the assistance of the fortune teller Maria, Anika sets out to find the truth about the matter.

Cast
 Madeleine Sologne as Anika
 José Noguéro as Sandor 
 Marguerite Moreno as Maria, la cartomancienne
 Jean Galland as Rakos
 Simone Héliard as 	Ilona
 Zita Fiore as Zita - La chanteuse
 Allain Dhurtal as 	Joska 
 Raymond Segard as Féry
 Jean Témerson as Alexander
 Alfred Rode as Imre
 Claude Roy as 	Le petit garçon

References

Bibliography 
 Crisp, Colin. Genre, Myth and Convention in the French Cinema, 1929-1939. Indiana University Press, 2002.

External links 
 

1940 films
French drama films
1940 drama films
1940s French-language films
Films directed by Emil-Edwin Reinert
Films directed by Alfred Rode
French black-and-white films
1940s French films